Manthokha Waterfall is a waterfall located in the Kharmang Valley, in Skardu, in Gilgit-Baltistan, in the extreme northern region of Pakistan. The waterfall is approximately 180 feet high, and located almost  from Skardu.

Tourism
The waterfall is set in green pastures, with streams, amid the towering rocky mountains of Karakorum. The nearby restaurant serves local trout fish, and sightseers can also visit the fish farm.

See also 
 List of waterfalls of Pakistan

References

External links 

 Manthoka Waterfalls – Pakistan
 Manthokha Waterfall Best for Fishing and Camping
 

Waterfalls of Pakistan
Kharmang District